4-Hydroxy-7-methoxy-3-oxo-3,4-dihydro-2H-1,4-benzoxazin-2-yl glucoside beta-D-glucosidase (DIMBOAGlc hydrolase, DIMBOA glucosidase) is an enzyme with systematic name (2R)-4-hydroxy-7-methoxy-3-oxo-3,4-dihydro-2H-1,4-benzoxazin-2-yl beta-D-glucopyranoside beta-D-glucosidase. This enzyme catalyses the following chemical reaction

 (1) (2R)-4-hydroxy-7-methoxy-3-oxo-3,4-dihydro-2H-1,4-benzoxazin-2-yl beta-D-glucopyranoside + H2O  2,4-dihydroxy-7-methoxy-2H-1,4-benzoxazin-3(4H)-one + D-glucose
 (2) (2R)-4-hydroxy-3-oxo-3,4-dihydro-2H-1,4-benzoxazin-2-yl beta-D-glucopyranoside + H2O  2,4-dihydroxy-2H-1,4-benzoxazin-3(4H)-one + D-glucose

The enzyme from Triticum aestivum (wheat) has a higher affinity for DIMBOA glucoside than DIBOA glucoside.

References

External links 
 

EC 3.2.1